The Knife is the seventh studio album by American ska punk band Goldfinger, released on July 21, 2017, through Rise Records. It marks the band's first album following a nine-year non-album gap, their longest ever. It is their first release featuring their new supergroup line-up consisting of guitarist/vocalist and founding member John Feldmann, lead guitarist Philip Sneed (Story of the Year), bassist Mike Herrera (MxPx, Mike Herrera's Tumbledown) and drummer Travis Barker (Blink-182). There are also several notable musicians who make guest appearances on the album.

Background
In the November/December 2010 issue No. 43 of SMASH magazine, Feldmann stated that a new EP or a possible full-length album was "in the works" with Feldmann having penned 4/5 new tracks, and Pfeiffer having recorded the drum tracks. Feldmann also states in the article that with the release of any new material would be supported with an extended tour. According to Feldmann, Goldfinger was expecting to have their new album out sometime in 2012. The band released a new song, "Am I Deaf", on Friday May 24, 2013. Four years later, Put the Knife Away was released.

In 2015, Feldmann did an interview with Fuse, noting that the band's future largely amounts to the occasional tour: "We'll probably release a song or two but I don't know if we're going to release albums anymore. We play the same songs we've always done."

Track listing
Am I Deaf was originally recorded in 2013 with Charlie Paulson, Kelly LeMieux, and Darrin Pfeiffer but has since been re-recorded for the album featuring Sneed, Herrera and Barker.

Personnel
Credits adapted from AllMusic and The Prelude Press.

Goldfinger
 John Feldmann – lead vocals, rhythm guitar, producer
 Philip Sneed – lead guitar
 Mike Herrera – bass guitar, backing vocals
 Travis Barker – drums

Additional musicians
 Zakk Cervini – bass guitar, guitar, keyboards
 Matt Pauling – bass guitar, guitar, keyboards
 Billy Kottage – keyboards, trombone
 Matt Appleton – saxophone
 John Christianson – trumpet

Guest artists
 Mark Hoppus (Blink-182) – co-lead vocals on "See You Around"
 Nick Hexum (311) – co-lead vocals on "Liftoff"
 Takahiro Moriuchi (One Ok Rock) – co-lead vocals on "Don't Let Me Go"
 Nate Albert (the Mighty Mighty Bosstones) – guitar on "Get What I Need"
 Makua Rothman – ukeke on "Liftoff"
 Josh Dun (Twenty One Pilots) – drums on "Orthodontist Girl"

Technical personnel
 Zakk Cervini – mixing, producer
 Matt Pauling – additional production, editing, engineer
 Brian Burnham – studio assistant
 Vinicius Gut – artwork, layout

Release history

References

2017 albums
Goldfinger (band) albums
Rise Records albums
Albums produced by John Feldmann